Buckley Claypits and Commons is a Site of Special Scientific Interest in the preserved county of Clwyd, north Wales. It is an important reserve for the great crested newt.

See also
List of Sites of Special Scientific Interest in Clwyd

References

Sites of Special Scientific Interest in Clwyd